Mount Vernon is a city in Davison County, South Dakota, United States. The population was 461 at the 2020 census. It is part of the Mitchell, South Dakota Micropolitan Statistical Area.

The town takes its name from Mount Vernon, the estate of George Washington; an early variant name was Arlandtown.

Geography

Mount Vernon is located at  (43.712155, -98.261264).

Mount Vernon has been assigned the ZIP code 57363 and the FIPS place code 44100.

Demographics

2010 census
As of the census of 2010, there were 462 people, 178 households, and 125 families residing in the city. The racial makeup of the city was 92.6% White, 5.4% Native American, 0.4% Pacific Islander, and 1.5% from two or more races. Hispanic or Latino of any race were 2.2% of the population.

There were 178 households, of which 39.9% had children under the age of 18 living with them, 59.0% were married couples living together, 6.2% had a female householder with no husband present, 5.1% had a male householder with no wife present, and 29.8% were non-families. 25.8% of all households were made up of individuals, and 10.1% had someone living alone who was 65 years of age or older. The average household size was 2.60 and the average family size was 3.15.

The median age in the city was 37.4 years. 30.1% of residents were under the age of 18; 6.8% were between the ages of 18 and 24; 23.8% were from 25 to 44; 26.4% were from 45 to 64; and 12.8% were 65 years of age or older. The gender makeup of the city was 53.0% male and 47.0% female.

2000 census
As of the census of 2000, there were 477 people, 177 households, and 127 families residing in the city. The population density was 1,489.3 people per square mile (575.5/km2). There were 189 housing units at an average density of 590.1 per square mile (228.0/km2). The racial makeup of the city was 98.11% White, 0.21% Native American, 1.68% from other races. Hispanic or Latino of any race were 1.68% of the population.

There were 177 households, out of which 40.7% had children under the age of 18 living with them, 63.3% were married couples living together, 6.2% had a female householder with no husband present, and 28.2% were non-families. 23.2% of all households were made up of individuals, and 11.9% had someone living alone who was 65 years of age or older. The average household size was 2.69 and the average family size was 3.23.

In the city, the population was spread out, with 31.9% under the age of 18, 6.7% from 18 to 24, 30.6% from 25 to 44, 18.0% from 45 to 64, and 12.8% who were 65 years of age or older. The median age was 35 years. For every 100 females, there were 99.6 males. For every 100 females age 18 and over, there were 91.2 males.

The median income for a household in the city was $36,806, and the median income for a family was $41,250. Males had a median income of $30,250 versus $17,500 for females. The per capita income for the city was $14,864. About 2.3% of families and 4.1% of the population were below the poverty line, including 1.3% of those under age 18 and 12.3% of those age 65 or over.

Notable people
 Chad Greenway, Minnesota Vikings linebacker
 Ralph Homan, businessman and member of the South Dakota House of Representatives
 Joshua Klumb businessman, farmer, and member of the South Dakota Senate

References

Cities in South Dakota
Cities in Davison County, South Dakota
Mitchell, South Dakota micropolitan area